John Cocks (1787–1861) was a British phycologist.

He was the first to discover the red algae Stenogramme interrupta, on 21 Oct 1846.

References

British botanists
Phycologists
1787 births
1861 deaths
Place of birth missing
Place of death missing